Academy Aperture 2025 is a new diversity standard for best picture nominees created by the Academy of Motion Picture Arts and Sciences that is set to begin in 2024. Deadline Hollywood described this as a "plan to require that Best Picture contenders meet at least two of four inclusion standards aimed at increasing screen depictions or employment of underrepresented groups — women, specified racial and ethnic groups, LGBTQ+ individuals, people with cognitive and physical disabilities, and those hard of hearing."

References

External links
 Academy Aperture 2025 at oscars.org

Academy Awards